Manning Road is a  road in Perth, Western Australia, linking Albany Highway in Cannington to Kwinana Freeway in Como. It forms the entirety of State Route 26.

Manning Road, along with the suburb of Manning, is named after the Manning family, significant landholders in the early years of the Swan River Colony. Henry Lucius Manning purchased land in the vicinity of Mount Henry (near modern-day Salter Point) in 1840, and likely sent his younger brother Charles Alexander Manning to conduct business on behalf of the family, rather than travel to the colony himself. By around 1866, the Manning had a large  estate bounded by the Canning River, Henley Street, and Mount Henry. In 1913, the family divided the estate into 27 lots, three of which, near Canning Bridge, became further subdivided into urban lots. The Mannings retained much of the property until 1948, when the state government resumed the land to create a model suburb originally name Manning Park. Manning Road was the name given to Public Road No 123.

The road's condition was the subject of much public discussion in the 1950s.

A proposal was drawn in the 1980s to construct a southbound on-ramp at the western terminus with the Kwinana Freeway. The land requirements were included on the Perth Metropolitan Region Scheme. The City of South Perth considered the ramp a "major priority" that would increase its road network connectivity, reduce traffic congestion, and improve commuter safety. In 2001, the City estimated the construction cost to be $1.77 million. Construction of the ramp commenced in October 2019 at a cost of $35 million. The ramp opened on the morning of 13 July 2020.

References

Roads in Perth, Western Australia